Bobo Karlsson (30 December 1946 in Karlstad - 7 March 2017 in Stockholm) was a Swedish journalist and author. He created the magazine City and worked as a journalist for Dagens Nyheter, Svenska Dagbladet and Göteborgs-Posten. Karlsson also published the books New York, New York: En guide till 80-talets metropolis (1981) and Drömmen om Kalifornien: Los Angeles, San Francisco & Las Vegas (1984) both by Prisma publishers. He would later also publish the books Urban Safari: 12 Storstäder and Urban Safari 2: 12 nya storstäder.

References

1946 births
2017 deaths
Swedish journalists
People from Karlstad